Peter McEvoy is an English golfer.

Peter McEvoy may also refer to:
Peter McEvoy (journalist), Australian journalist
Peter David McEvoy, a suspect in the Walsh Street police shootings